KCA may refer to:

IATA code for Kuqa Qiuci Airport, China
Kerala Cricket Association
Nickelodeon Kids' Choice Awards
Kyiv Christian Academy
Kikuyu Central Association
Krupp cemented armour
Kenya College of Accountancy
KCA DEUTAG, oil and gas services company
Kalam Cosmological Argument

kca may refer to:

Khanty or Ostyak language, ISO-639-3 code